Queen Jeongseong (정성왕후 서씨; 12 January 1693 – 3 April 1757), of the Daegu Seo clan, was the first wife of King Yeongjo of Joseon and the adoptive mother of Crown Prince Sado.

Biography
The future queen was born on 12 January 1693 in Gahoebang (가회방, 嘉會坊). She was the second daughter and fourth child of Seo Jong-jae and Lady Yi of the Ubong Yi clan.

In November 1703, at the age of ten, she married the eight-year-old Prince Yeoning. As the wife of a prince, she was given the title of Princess Consort Dalseong (달성군부인). On their first night of marriage, it was said that Prince Yeoning had asked how were the hands of the princess so pretty. The princess responded by saying that she never did any labor to get them dirty. This comment had unsettled the Prince because it reminded him of his mother, Royal Noble Consort Suk.

It was said that from then on to her death as Queen, the Princess was not visited much from the Prince.

In 1720, her husband was appointed as Crown Prince (왕세제, 王世弟), As his wife, Dalseong was given the title Crown Princess Consort (왕세제빈).

In 1724, Prince Yeoning's older brother, King Gyeongjong died. Prince Yeoning ascended the throne on 30 August of that year as King Yeongjo and she became his queen consort.

As queen, it was said that she held a generous character to her. The Queen had also cherished and treated Crown Prince Hyojang, Yi Jeong-bin's son, and Crown Prince Sado, Yi Yeong-bin’s son, as if they were her own sons.

The Queen died at Changdeok Palace on 3 April 1757. Her death distressed Crown Prince Sado, contributing to his declining mental condition. Queen Jeongseong had no biological children.

Family 

Parent
 Uncle - Seo Jong-cheok (서종척, 徐宗惕)
 Father − Seo Jong-jae (서종제, 徐宗悌) (1656 - 1719)
 Uncle - Seo Jong-shin (서종신, 徐宗愼)
 Uncle - Seo Jong-hyeob (서종협, 徐宗恊)
 Uncle - Seo Jong-il (서종일, 徐宗一)
 1) Grandfather − Seo Mun-do (서문도, 徐文道) (1628 - 1700)
 2) Great-Grandfather − Seo Hyeong-ri (서형리, 徐亨履) (1596 - 1667)
 3) Great-Great-Grandfather − Seo Kyeong-su (서경수, 徐景需)
 4) Great-Great-Great-Grandfather - Seo Seong (서성, 徐渻) (1558 - 1631)
 4) Great-Great-Great-Grandmother - Lady Song (송씨, 宋氏); daughter of Song Ryeong (송령, 宋寧)
 2) Great-Grandmother − Lady Seong of the Changnyeong Seong clan (증 정경부인 창녕 성씨, 贈 貞敬夫人 昌寧 成氏) (1596 - 1668) 
 1) Grandmother − Lady Kim of the Andong Kim clan (증 정경부인 안동 김씨, 贈 貞敬夫人 安東 金氏) (1630 - 1709)
 Mother − Internal Princess Consort Jamseong of the Ubong Yi clan (잠성부부인 우봉 이씨, 岑城府夫人 牛峰 李氏) (1660 - 1738)
 Grandmother - Lady Kim of the Uiseong Kim clan (의성 김씨, 義城 金氏)
 Grandfather - Yi Sa-chang (이사창, 李師昌)

Sibling(s)
 Older brother − Seo Myeong-baek (서명백, 徐命伯) (1678 - 1738)
 Sister-in-law − Lady Yi of the Yeoju Yi clan (여주 이씨, 驪州 李氏) (1676 - 1733)
 Nephew − Seo Deok-su (서덕수, 徐德修) (1694 - 1722)
 Nephew − Seo In-su (서인수, 徐仁修)
 Nephew − Seo Shin-su (서신수, 徐信修)
 Older brother − Seo Myeong-hyu (서명휴, 徐命休)
 Nephew − Seo No-su (서노수, 徐魯修)
 Older sister − Lady Seo of the Daegu Seo clan 
 Brother-in-law − Yi Jong-gyeong (이중경, 李重慶)
 Older sister − Lady Seo of the Daegu Seo clan
 Brother-in-law − Shin Jeong-jib (신정집, 申正集)
 Younger sister − Lady Seo of the Daegu Seo clan 
 Brother-in-law − Im Geo (임거, 林蘧)

In popular culture
 Portrayed by Kim Ae-kyung in the 1988 MBC TV series 500 Years of Joseon: Memoirs of Lady Hyegyeong.
Portrayed by Moon Ye-ji in the 1998 MBC TV series The King's Road.
Portrayed by Jung Mo-rye and Shin Gyu-ri in the 2010 MBC TV series Dong Yi.
Portrayed by Park Shin-hye in the 2014 film The Royal Tailor.
Portrayed by Park Myung-shin in the 2015 film The Throne.
Portrayed by Kim Sun-kyung in the 2017 MBC TV series The Emperor: Owner of the Mask.
Portrayed by Choi Soo-im in the 2019 SBS TV series Haechi.

Notes and references

1693 births
1757 deaths
Royal consorts of the Joseon dynasty
Korean queens consort
18th-century Korean women